El delantero centro fue asesinado al atardecer (1989) (English, Offside) is a novel from Manuel Vázquez Montalbán.

Plot 
The private detective Pepe Carvalho is enquiring about a list of death threats arriving after that FC Barcelona purchases the football star Jack Mortimer.

1989 novels
20th-century Spanish novels
Novels by Manuel Vázquez Montalbán
Novels about association football
FC Barcelona
Novels set in Barcelona